Mapleshade Records is an American jazz record company and independent record label founded by Pierre Sprey in Upper Marlboro, Maryland, United States, in 1990.

Mapleshade's catalogue includes Bobby Battle, Gary Bartz, Walter Davis, Clifford Jordan, Frank Kimbrough, and Norris Turney. Sprey, an electronics enthusiast, built his equipment and has a recording studio in his house. At one time, Hamiet Bluiett and Larry Willis were artists and repertoire (A&R) men for the company. Both musicians recorded albums as leaders for the label.

Before his career in jazz recording, Sprey worked as a systems analyst in The Pentagon, helping with the proposals for the A-10 and Lightweight Fighter program.

A sister label, Wildchild Records, was founded in 1995. In later years the label branched into R&B and blues.

Roster

 Steve Abshire
 Douglas Allanbrook
 Okyerema Asante
 Gary Bartz
 Bobby Battle
 Keter Betts
 Hamiet Bluiett
 Walter Davis Jr.
 Archie Edwards

 Frank Foster
 John Hicks
 Shirley Horn
 Clifford Jordan
 Frank Kimbrough
 Danny Knicely
 Consuela Lee
 Paul Murphy
 Ted Nash

 Bob Northern
 John Purcell
 Tao Ruspoli
 Gali Sanchez
 Kendra Shank
 Warren Smith
 Sunny Sumper
 Norris Turney
 Charles Williams
 Larry Willis

External links

References

American record labels
Audiophile record labels
Jazz record labels
Record labels established in 1990
1990 establishments in Maryland
American companies established in 1990
Companies based in Baltimore